Gibril Donald Wilson (born November 12, 1981) is a former American football safety in the National Football League (NFL). He was drafted by the New York Giants in the fifth round of the 2004 NFL Draft. He played college football at Tennessee.

Wilson earned a Super Bowl ring with the Giants in Super Bowl XLII. He has also played for the Oakland Raiders and Miami Dolphins.

College career
Wilson was born in Freetown, Sierra Leone and moved to the U.S. at age five. Although Wilson excelled in football as both a wide receiver and defensive back at Oak Grove High School, he drew little attention from any Division I schools. He initially attended City College of San Francisco, and two years later was the top recruited junior college safety, choosing Tennessee over USC, Oregon and Florida.

Professional career

New York Giants
He was drafted by the New York Giants in the fifth round of the 2004 NFL Draft, with whom he later won Super Bowl XLII.  His team beat the New England Patriots in that game. In his four years with the team, he started 51 of 52 games, recording 360 tackles, six sacks, and 11 interceptions.

Oakland Raiders
In 2008, Wilson signed a six-year, $39 million contract with the Oakland Raiders, making him one of the highest paid safeties in NFL history.

Wilson was released by the Raiders after one season with the team on February 20, 2009. He finished the season with 129 tackles, 1.5 sacks, and two interceptions.

Miami Dolphins
Wilson agreed to a five-year contract with the Miami Dolphins on February 26, 2009.  The contract was worth $27.5 million with $8 million guaranteed. Wilson was released on March 5, 2010.

Cincinnati Bengals
Wilson signed with the Cincinnati Bengals on May 6, 2010. During a preseason game with the Philadelphia Eagles, he injured the ACL and MCL in his left knee. Following surgery he sat out the 2010 season.

References

1981 births
Living people
Players of American football from San Jose, California
Sierra Leonean players of American football
Oku people
American football safeties
City College of San Francisco Rams football players
Tennessee Volunteers football players
New York Giants players
Oakland Raiders players
Miami Dolphins players
Cincinnati Bengals players
American people of Sierra Leonean descent
Sportspeople of Sierra Leonean descent
Sportspeople from Freetown